Ernest Henri Besnier (21 April 1831 – 15 May 1909, Paris) was a French dermatologist and medical director of the Hôpital Saint-Louis in Paris. He was a native of Honfleur, département Calvados.

He studied medicine in Paris, where in 1857 he received his medical doctorate. In 1863 he became médecin des hôpitaux. In 1873 he succeeded Pierre-Antoine-Ernest Bazin (1807–1878) as dermatologist at the Hôpital Saint Louis, where later the same year, he was named director.

He built histopathology and parasitology laboratories at the hospital, and is credited with originating the term biopsy for tissue samples. In 1889 he proved an early description of skin lesions associated with sarcoidosis, introducing the name "lupus pernio".

With Pierre Adolphe Adrien Doyon (1827–1907), he founded the medical journal Annales de dermatologie et de syphiligraphie. Besnier attempted to balance the differences between the French and Viennese approaches to dermatological medicine, and in 1881 with Doyon, translated Moritz Kaposi's famous book on skin diseases (Pathologie und Therapie der Hautkrankheiten in Vorlesungen für praktische Ärzte und Studirende) from German into French (Leçons sur les maladies de la peau). With Louis-Anne-Jean Brocq and Lucien Jacquet, he published a four volume encyclopedia of dermatology, titled "La pratique dermatologique" (1900–04).

The eponymous Besnier's prurigo is named for a skin disorder that often follows infantile atopic dermatitis.

References 
 Ernest Henri Besnier at Who Named It

External links
 

1831 births
1909 deaths
People from Honfleur
French dermatologists
19th-century French physicians
20th-century French physicians
Officiers of the Légion d'honneur